On 31 December 2017 at about 3:15pm AEDT (UTC+11:00), a de Havilland Canada DHC-2 Beaver configured as a floatplane crashed into Jerusalem Bay off Cowan Creek, on the northern outskirts of Sydney, Australia. The aircraft, operated by Sydney Seaplanes, was carrying five passengers and a pilot, all of whom were killed in the crash. It was returning diners from Cottage Point Inn restaurant to Rose Bay Water Airport.
The ATSB believes it probable that the pilot's performance was adversely affected by carbon monoxide poisoning. Post mortem tests on the bodies of the victims showed raised levels of CO in the blood, and a crack in the exhaust system was seen as the likely source of the gas.

Aircraft
The aircraft was a 54-year-old de Havilland Canada DHC-2 Beaver, originally built in 1963 and registered in Australia since February 1964; it was powered by a single Pratt & Whitney R-985 Wasp Junior engine.

In 1996, the aircraft was destroyed in a crash while working as a crop duster near Armidale, New South Wales, killing the pilot. The aircraft was then completely rebuilt; the Civil Aviation Safety Authority confirmed that it had been repaired according to industry requirements.

Victims
The Canadian-Australian pilot and five British tourists – Richard Cousins, 58, CEO of British foodservice company Compass Group, his two sons, his fiancée and her daughter – were killed in the crash.

Investigation
The Australian Transport Safety Bureau (ATSB) opened an investigation into the accident. Most of the wreckage of the aircraft was raised on 4 January 2018. The intermediate report, published on 31 January 2018, indicated that the aircraft was found to have followed a differing flight path from the usual, and had failed to climb to the necessary altitude needed to fly over the surrounding terrain. It also indicated that the preliminary examination of aircraft flight control surfaces and controls seemed in sound order and expected positions, and that the engine sounded normal to witnesses on the ground. The aircraft landed inverted and all six on board suffered fatal injuries.

On 28 January 2021, the ATSB released a final report to the accident, which concluded that the pilot and passengers had higher than normal levels of carboxyhaemoglobin in their blood. Additionally, several pre-existing cracks in the exhaust collector ring, very likely released exhaust gas into the engine/accessory bay, very likely entered the cabin through holes in the main firewall where three bolts were missing from the magneto access panels. The aircraft was fitted with a disposable CO detector, but CO detectors of its kind have been widely deemed unreliable.

The operators of the aircraft have implemented changes to the aircraft's system of maintenance, which include:

 The aircraft being fitted with active electronic CO detectors.
 The check of the serviceability of the CO detectors has been incorporated into the monthly emergency equipment checklist.
 Directing its new maintenance provider that the removal and installation of the main firewall access panels must be classified as a critical maintenance operation task, and will require certification by a licensed aircraft maintenance engineer and a conformity inspection.
 Directing its new maintenance provider that following maintenance activities on the engine exhaust system or use of the main firewall access panels, the test for the presence of CO must be conducted.
 An inspection of the magneto access panels and CO testing has been incorporated into the 100-hourly 'B' check inspection.

In popular culture 
The crash was featured in season 23, episode 7 of the Canadian documentary series Mayday, titled "Dream Flight Disaster".

See also
 2019 English Channel Piper PA-46 crash - another light aircraft crash where carbon monoxide poisoning was a significant cause

References

Sydney Seaplanes crash
Sydney Seaplanes crash
Accidents and incidents involving the de Havilland Canada DHC-2 Beaver
Sydney Seaplanes crash
Sydney Seaplanes crash
Sydney Seaplanes crash
2017 disasters in Australia